Jane Gaugain (née Alison; born 26 March 1804) was a Scottish knitter and writer. She built up a successful business in Edinburgh, Scotland, and published 16 volumes on knitting that helped make it a popular pastime for ladies and a source of income for lower classes of women. Her unusually written pattern books are important in the history of textiles in Scotland.

Biography
Gaugain was born in 1804 in Dalkeith, Midlothian and was the daughter of a tailor, James Alison. After marrying English cloth importer John James Gaugain (known as James or J.J.), she worked in her husband's shop at 63 George Street and helped turn it into a thriving haberdashery. Gaugain wrote and disseminated knitting patterns throughout the 1830s from her shop and published her first pattern book in 1840. It was called "Lady's Assistant in Knitting, Netting and Crochet." She had a particular way of writing her patterns with full instructions at the beginning detailing the meanings of abbreviations. The book was very popular. The book reached a massive audience in the UK and America and was the best-selling knitting book of the period. It ran to 22 editions. Throughout the 1840s and 50s, she published a great many titles. In response to readers’ feedback, she began to produce charted paper and instructions that allowed knitters to create their own designs and began accepting mail orders at the Edinburgh shop.

Gaugain died in 1860 from phthisis pulmonalis (tuberculosis) and is buried in Edinburgh's Dean Cemetery near the Water of Leith.

Legacy
In 2012, knitter Franklin Habit adapted one of Jane Gaugain's patterns, a pineapple-shaped purse, for a modern audience in the summer 2012 issue of Knitty. Knitters today continue to use and be inspired by Jane Gaugain's patterns, and she is beginning to be recognized as an 'unsung hero' of the history of women entrepreneurs and knitting.

Selected works

Notes

References

Further reading

External links

 Patterns hosted on Ravelry

1860 deaths
19th-century British writers
19th-century British women writers
19th-century Scottish writers
19th-century Scottish women writers
People in knitting